Joseph Smith Sr. (July 12, 1771 – September 14, 1840) was the father of Joseph Smith Jr., the founder of the Latter Day Saint movement. Joseph Sr. was also one of the Eight Witnesses of the Book of Mormon, which Mormons believe was translated by Smith Jr. from golden plates. In 1833, Smith Sr. was named the first patriarch of the Church of Christ (which was renamed to the Church of the Latter Day Saints in 1834 and Church of Jesus Christ of Latter Day Saints in 1838). Joseph Sr. was also a member of the First Presidency of the church.

Early life
Smith was born on July 12, 1771, in Topsfield, Massachusetts, to Asael Smith and Mary Duty. He married Lucy Mack in Tunbridge, Vermont, on January 26, 1796, and had 11 children with her. Details of Smith’s paternal line go back to his 3rd great-grandfather Robert Smith from Lincolnshire, England who settled in Massachusetts colony during the Puritan migration. Some previous DNA testing on Smith’s descendants had revealed some Irish roots.

Smith tried his hands at several professions, including farmer, teacher, and shop-keeper, none of which proved very successful. He moved his family to Palmyra, New York, in 1816 and began to make payments on a farm located on the edge of neighboring Manchester Township. He was raised to the degree of Master Mason on May 7, 1818, in Ontario Lodge No. 23 of Canandaigua, New York. In the Palmyra–Manchester area, Smith and his sons were involved in a number of treasure digging excavations in the 1820s.

Work on a frame house at the farm was halted by the unexpected death of Smith's eldest son, Alvin, in 1823. Smith subsequently failed to make payments on the farm. Lemuel Durfee purchased it as a favor to the family and allowed the Smiths to continue there as renters through 1830.

Though a spiritual man, Smith showed little interest in organized religion prior to his son Joseph reporting his visions to the family. He was content to allow his wife control over the religious upbringing of their children. This indifference bothered Lucy very much. After much prayer, she said she had received a divine witness that her husband would some day accept "the pure and undefiled Gospel of the Son of God."

Smith professed that he had visionary dreams with highly symbolic content, perhaps related to his ambivalence about religious faith and sometimes presaging events to come. These dreams continued after the family's move to Palmyra until he had had seven in all; Lucy remembered five well enough to quote in detail.

Book of Mormon

In the late 1820s, Smith's son, Joseph Jr., began to tell the family about golden plates, which he said contained a record of the ancient inhabitants of the Americas. In September 1827, Joseph Jr. said he obtained the plates. In the following years, Joseph Jr. said he translated the plates into English through the use of a seer stone, which he found previously during a treasure digging expedition, as well as the Urim and Thummim, a device given to him by the angel Moroni. When the work was near completion, at the end of June 1829, Joseph Sr. and seven other men signed a joint statement, testifying that they had both lifted the plates and seen the engravings on the plates. Known as the "Testimony of the Eight Witnesses", this statement was published with the first edition of the Book of Mormon and has been a part of nearly all subsequent editions.

Smith was baptized when the Church of Christ was formally organized on April 6, 1830. When Joseph Jr. saw Joseph Sr. come up out of the water, he is reported to have cried, "Oh! My God I have lived to see my own father baptized into the true church of Jesus Christ!"

Presiding Patriarch
In January 1831, Smith and his family moved to the church's new headquarters in Kirtland, Ohio. He was ordained to be the church's first Presiding Patriarch on December 18, 1833.

In reference to his father's role as patriarch of the church, Joseph Jr. likened his father to Adam, the first biblical patriarch: "So shall it be with my father; he shall be called a prince over his posterity, holding the keys of the patriarchal priesthood over the kingdom of God on earth, even the Church of the Latter Day Saints".

As part of his new role, Smith presided in council meetings and administered patriarchal blessings.

On September 3, 1837, Smith was also made an Assistant Counselor to his son in the First Presidency of the church.

Deathbed blessings

Smith moved with his family to Far West, Missouri, in 1838 and from there to the church's new headquarters at Nauvoo, Illinois, in 1839. Old age and illnesses had taken their toll and by the end of summer 1840, Smith realized he was dying. He called his family around him to administer patriarchal blessings.

He blessed his wife: "Mother, do you not know that you are the mother of as great a family as ever lived upon the earth. ... They are raised up to do the Lord's work". He blessed and ordained his eldest surviving son, Hyrum to succeed to the office of Presiding Patriarch by right of lineage.

Smith died in Nauvoo on September 14, 1840.

Descendants

Notes

References
 
 
  ASIN B000M7VGQ8
 

| colspan="3" style="background: #f2f2f2; border-top: 5px solid #FABE60; border-bottom: none; border-left: none; border-right: none;" |

| colspan="3" style="background: #f2f2f2; border: none;"|

1771 births
1840 deaths
American Latter Day Saint missionaries
Book of Mormon witnesses
Burials at the Smith Family Cemetery
Converts to Mormonism
Counselors in the First Presidency (LDS Church)
Doctrine and Covenants people
History of the Latter Day Saint movement
Latter Day Saint missionaries in the United States
Leaders in the Church of Christ (Latter Day Saints)
People from Ontario County, New York
People from Palmyra, New York
People from Topsfield, Massachusetts
Presiding Patriarchs (LDS Church)
Religious leaders from New York (state)
Smith family (Latter Day Saints)
Treasure hunters